Škrilje is a small settlement on the left bank of the Kolpa River south of Podzemelj in the Municipality of Metlika in the White Carniola area of southeastern Slovenia. The area is part of the traditional region of Lower Carniola and is now included in the Southeast Slovenia Statistical Region.

References

External links

Škrilje on Geopedia

Populated places in the Municipality of Metlika